Liljeholmens Stearinfabriks AB is a Swedish candle manufacturer. The factory is located in Oskarshamn, Sweden.

History 
The company was founded in 1839 by Lars Johan Hierta, the same person who founded the Swedish daily newspaper Aftonbladet. Originally the factory was located to Stockholm but in 1970 a new factory and a factory outlet was built in coastal town Oskarshamn, in the south-east of Sweden.

Production 
Today the factory is the world's largest manufacturer specialized in stearin candles. The yearly production is about 10 000 tons.

References

Manufacturing companies of Sweden
Oskarshamn
Purveyors to the Court of Sweden
Swedish companies established in 1839
Manufacturing companies established in 1839
Companies based in Kalmar County